The National Fire Service (NFS) was the single fire service created in Great Britain in 1941 during the Second World War; a separate National Fire Service (Northern Ireland) was created in 1942.

The NFS was created in August 1941 by the amalgamation of the wartime national Auxiliary Fire Service (AFS) and the local authority fire brigades (about 1,600 of them). It existed until 1948, when it was again split by the Fire Services Act 1947, with fire services reverting to local authority control, although this time there were far fewer brigades, with only one per county and county borough.

The NFS had full-time and part-time members, male and female. Its uniform was the traditional dark blue double-breasted tunic, and it adopted the peaked cap worn by the AFS instead of the peakless sailor-style cap which had been worn by many pre-war fire brigades (including the London Fire Brigade). The peaked cap was retained by fire services after the war.

When they were on duty, but in the frequent long stretches between calls, many firemen and firewomen performed vital wartime manufacturing work, in workshops in the fire stations or adjacent to them. This was entirely voluntary, but since many of the wartime personnel had worked in factories before the war it was work with which they were familiar and skilled.

War service meant considerable risk, and members of the NFS were called to attend the aftermath of German bombing raids and coastal shelling from France, or often whilst these attacks were still ongoing. Casualties were inevitable, and there is one record of one volunteer who died on duty aged just 19, and was awarded the Certificate for Gallantry as a result. He is buried in the Hamilton Road Cemetery, Deal, Kent.

The Chief of the Fire Staff and Inspector-in-Chief throughout the war (until 28 February 1947, when he retired) was Sir Aylmer Firebrace, former Chief Officer of the London Fire Brigade.

At peak strength the NFS had 370,000 personnel, including 80,000 women. The women were mostly employed on administrative duties.

The NFS was divided into about forty Fire Forces. These were subdivided into Divisions. Each Division had two Columns and each Column had five Companies.

Ranks

Notable members
Sir Frederick Delve (career firefighter and fire service administrator)
Leslie Leete (career firefighter - later successor to Delve as chief officer of London Fire Brigade)
Members of the NFS who were well known in civilian life (or later became so) included:
Len Johnson, boxer and civil rights activist (served in Manchester and Cumbria)
Paul Brooks, cricketer (served in London and Coventry)

An eleven-minute Second World War documentary that chronicles the birth and work of the NFS survived the war and is available to view on the British Pathe website.

Service personnel received Certificate of Service documents.

See also
 Ministry of Civil Aviation Aerodrome Fire Service
 Fire services in the United Kingdom

Footnotes

Defunct fire and rescue services of the United Kingdom
1941 establishments in the United Kingdom
1948 disestablishments in the United Kingdom
Civil defence organisations based in the United Kingdom
United Kingdom home front during World War II